The Battle for One Destiny (Ma'rakat al-masīr al-wāhid) is a political theory literature book of 1958 that composes a combined volume of the writings and chiefly editorial articles of Ba'athist leader Michel Aflaq. The book argues that Western imperialism and Zionism are the greatest impediments to pan-Arab unity.

References

Anti-imperialism
Anti-Zionism in the Arab world
Ba'athism
Books about nationalism
Books in political philosophy
Political books
Political manifestos
1958 non-fiction books
Pan-Arabist media